Popencu (Popenky, Popenki) is a commune in the north of Transnistria, Moldova. It consists of four villages: Chirov (Кірове, Кирово), Popencu, Vladimirovca (Володимирівка, Владимировка) and Zăzuleni (Зозуляни, Зозуляны), and is part of the Rîbnița District.  

The village of Zăzuleni is the site of the Church of Paraskeva the Serbian, a Russian Orthodox church. 

communes of Transnistria
Rîbnița District